Hartford is a city in Sebastian County, Arkansas, United States. It is part of the Fort Smith, Arkansas-Oklahoma Metropolitan Statistical Area. The population was 642 at the 2010 census.

Clergyman James T. Draper, Jr., president of the Southern Baptist Convention from 1982 to 1984, was born in Hartford in 1935, where his father, James Draper, Sr., was a pastor.

Geography
Hartford is located at  (35.023358, -94.378398).

Demographics

As of the census of 2000, there were 772 people, 299 households, and 217 families residing in the city. The racial makeup of the city was 93.52% White, 1.17% Native American, 0.13% Asian, 1.55% from other races, and 3.63% from two or more races.  2.46% of the population were Hispanic or Latino of any race.

There were 299 households, out of which 30.1% had children under the age of 18 living with them, 56.2% were married couples living together, 11.4% had a female householder with no husband present, and 27.4% were non-families. 24.1% of all households were made up of individuals, and 13.0% had someone living alone who was 65 years of age or older.  The average household size was 2.58 and the average family size was 3.05.

In the city, the population was spread out, with 26.4% under the age of 18, 7.1% from 18 to 24, 27.3% from 25 to 44, 21.6% from 45 to 64, and 17.5% who were 65 years of age or older.  The median age was 38 years. For every 100 females, there were 93.5 males.  For every 100 females age 18 and over, there were 90.0 males.

The median income for a household in the city was $22,500, and the median income for a family was $27,321. Males had a median income of $28,250 versus $22,813 for females. The per capita income for the city was $10,845.  About 19.2% of families and 25.9% of the population were below the poverty line, including 39.0% of those under age 18 and 18.3% of those age 65 or over.

History 

The town of Hartford was first called Gwynn when it was originally settled. Prior to 1900, the town saw the arrival of the Rock Island Railroad, and the town's name was changed to Hartford. Hartford was incorporated in 1900 and as a result, the old original town of Hartford, about one and a half miles west and named for a creek crossing belonging to the Hart family, is now generally referred to as "Old Town" or "West Hartford". According to Goodspeed's "History of Arkansas", William J. Fleming and William Stevenson opened the first store in West Hartford.  By 1891 there were several businesses, a public school, and a Union Church edifice used respectively by Methodists, Baptists, and Cumberland Presbyterians.

The town of Hartford was incorporated February 28, 1900.

On 2 April 1912, Hartford elected a miner, Peter Stewart, as mayor. He was the first socialist mayor elected in Arkansas.

A labor conflict known the Hartford coal mine riot occurred in and around the town on 12 July 1914.

During the early half of the 20th century, the town was home to the Hartford Music Company, which published Gospel music and operated a singing school.  The city was also home to significant mining activity, which has returned to a limited extent. Most farm owners have oil or gas pumps in farmland across the town.

The town has views of both Sugarloaf and Poteau mountains. Very close to the Oklahoma border, Hartford is a mixture of a quaint country town and a new modern touch. Hartford is the home of the last working coal mine in the state of Arkansas.

Education
It is in the Hackett School District. Hackett High School is the district's sole comprehensive high school.

Hartford was previously in the Hartford School District. In 2014 the Hartford district agreed to merge into the Hackett district, effective 2015. Hartford High School was the Hartford district's comprehensive high school, staying with the Hackett District until its 2018 closure. Hartford Elementary, the elementary school, closed at the same time.

West Hartford
West Hartford is a populated place to the southwest, about halfway to the Oklahoma state border.  The National Register of Historic Places-listed Sebastian County Road 4G Bridge is nearby.

References

External links
Hartford High School
New York Times article on Peter Stewart

Cities in Arkansas
Cities in Sebastian County, Arkansas
Fort Smith metropolitan area
Populated places established in 1900